S. imbricata may refer to:
 Scaphyglottis imbricata, an orchid species found from Mexico to northern and western South America
 Salsola imbricata, a synonym of Caroxylon imbricatum, a shrub species

Synonyms
 Stypandra imbricata, a synonym for Stypandra glauca, a flowering plant species

See also
 Imbricata